Snooker world rankings 2008/2009: The professional world rankings for all the professional snooker players in the 2007–08 season who qualified for the 2008–09 season are listed below. The points listed here take into account the snooker world ranking points 2006/2007 and snooker world ranking points 2007/2008.

Notes

Three former top 16 players re-enter that group. They are Joe Perry, Marco Fu and Mark King.
Mark Allen is the only new member of the top 16.
The players to drop out the top 16 are long standing top 16 players: Stephen Lee (a member of the top 16 for 11 consecutive seasons), Mark Williams (for 12), Ken Doherty (for 15) and Steve Davis.
Players to reach career high rankings within the top 16 are: Stephen Maguire No.2, Mark Selby No.4, Ali Carter No.7, Ryan Day No.8, Joe Perry No.12, Marco Fu No.14 and Mark Allen No.16.
No new players reach the top 32, however two players return: former world No.9 Fergal O'Brien at No.24 and Michael Judge at No.30. Two players drop out: Gerard Greene and Michael Holt to 33rd and 34th place respectively.
Other players to reach career high rankings within the top 64 are: Jamie Cope up to No.19, Stuart Bingham No.21, Ricky Walden No.35, Andrew Higginson No.38, Liang Wenbo No.40, Judd Trump No.41, David Gilbert No.43, Rory McLeod No.44, Jimmy Michie No.46, Mike Dunn No.47, Tom Ford No.48, Liu Song No.53 and Ian Preece No.55. New players to enter the top 64 are Mark Joyce at No.59, Martin Gould No.63 and David Morris No.64.
Former top player Jimmy White fall out the top 64 to 65th place, but remained on the tour via the one year list.
Former top 32 player Robin Hull retired from the main tour due to illness.

References

2008
Rankings 2009
Rankings 2008